José Luis Ortiz Irizarry (June 25, 1947 – January 20, 2011) was a Puerto Rican professional baseball player, an outfielder who played in the Major Leagues between  to  for the Chicago Cubs and Chicago White Sox.

He was traded along with Ossie Blanco by the White Sox to the Chicago Cubs for Dave Lemonds, Roe Skidmore and Pat Jacquez on November 30, 1970.

Ortiz appeared in 67 Major League games played over parts of those three seasons, including 36 for the 1971 Cubs. He collected 37 hits, including nine doubles and one triple. He had a .301 career average in 123 at bats. Defensively, Ortiz also accepted 72 total chances (67 putouts, 5 assists) as an outfielder without an error for a 1.000 fielding percentage. He played eleven seasons and 1,159 games in minor league baseball, retiring after the 1976 season.

Ortiz was manager for the Tucson Mexican All-Stars of the Arizona League from 1999 to 2000.

References

External links

1947 births
2011 deaths
Angeles de Puebla players
Appleton Foxes players
Cardenales de Villahermosa players
Chicago Cubs players
Chicago White Sox players
Evansville White Sox players
Gulf Coast White Sox players
Hawaii Islanders players
Major League Baseball outfielders
Major League Baseball players from Puerto Rico
Midland Cubs players
Puerto Rican expatriate baseball players in Mexico
Tacoma Cubs players
Tucson Toros players
Wichita Aeros players
Sportspeople from Ponce, Puerto Rico